Brandeis is a surname.

People 
Antonietta Brandeis (1848–1926), Czech-born Italian painter
Brandeis Marshall, American data scientist
Friedl Dicker-Brandeis, Austrian artist and Holocaust victim
Irma Brandeis, American Dante scholar
Louis Brandeis, U.S. Supreme Court Justice

Named for Louis Brandeis 
Brandeis Brief, a 1908 document written by Brandeis as a litigator
Brandeis University, in Massachusetts, U.S.
Brandeis-Bardin Institute, now the Brandeis-Bardin Campus of American Jewish University, in California, U.S.
Louis D. Brandeis School of Law, at the University of Louisville in Kentucky, U.S.
Brandeis Medal, awarded by the University of Louisville's Louis D. Brandeis Society
Brandeis Award (disambiguation), several different awards
Kfar Brandeis (English: Brandeis village), a suburb of Hadera, Israel

See also
Brandýs nad Labem-Stará Boleslav, a town in the Czech Republic
Brandýs nad Orlicí, a town in the Czech Republic
J. L. Brandeis and Sons Store, an Omaha, Nebraska-based department store chain
Brandeis Brokers, a broker on the London Metal Exchange

Brandys (disambiguation)
Brandis (surname)
Brandes (disambiguation)

German-language surnames